Ana Lúcia de Camargo Barros (born ) is a Brazilian female volleyball player.

She was part of the Brazil women's national volleyball team at the 1988 Summer Olympics and 1992 Summer Olympics. She also competed at the 1986 FIVB Volleyball Women's World Championship.

References

External links
Ana Lucia at Sports Reference
http://poptug.com/history-of-brazilian-womens-volleyball-from-1951-to-2012/
http://hawaiiathletics.com/news/2016/8/9/womens-water-polo-mantellato-dias-realizes-olympic-dreams-on-brazil-water-polo-team.aspx?print=true

1965 births
Living people
Brazilian women's volleyball players
Place of birth missing (living people)
Olympic volleyball players of Brazil
Volleyball players at the 1988 Summer Olympics
Volleyball players at the 1992 Summer Olympics